Choghabur-e Kaki (also Romanized as Choghābūr-e Kākī; also known as Choqābūr-e Kākī) is a village in Gurani Rural District, Gahvareh District, Dalahu County, Kermanshah Province, Iran. At the 2006 census, its population was 94, in 22 families.

References 

Populated places in Dalahu County